John Lynch (February 18, 1825 – July 21, 1892) was a nineteenth-century politician, merchant, manufacturer and newspaper publisher from Maine.

Born in Portland, Maine, Lynch attended public schools as a child and graduated from Portland High School in 1842. He engaged in mercantile pursuits, was manager of the Portland Daily Press in 1862 and was a member of the Maine House of Representatives from 1862 to 1864. He was elected a Republican to the United States House of Representatives in 1864, serving from 1865 to 1873. There, Lynch served as chairman of the Committee on Expenditures in the Department of the Navy from 1869 to 1871 and of the Committee on Expenditures in the Department of the Treasury from 1871 to 1873. Afterward, he permanently moved to Washington, D.C. where he established the Washington Daily Union in 1877 and engaged in the manufacturing of bricks and drain pipes. Lynch died while on a visit to Portland, Maine on July 21, 1892, and was interred in Evergreen Cemetery in Portland.

External links

1825 births
1892 deaths
Republican Party members of the Maine House of Representatives
19th-century American newspaper publishers (people)
Politicians from Portland, Maine
People from Washington, D.C.
People of Maine in the American Civil War
Republican Party members of the United States House of Representatives from Maine
19th-century American journalists
American male journalists
19th-century American male writers
19th-century American politicians
Portland High School (Maine) alumni